Carl Petter Opsahl (born 31 May 1964 in Oslo, Norway) is a Norwegian priest, jazz musician and journalist.

Career 
Opsahl was involved in the establishment of "Caledonia Jazzband" (1982) and toured in New Orleans (1983), whereupon he settled there and played in the "All Star Brass Band" (1986). Later he established the Chateau Neuf Spelemannslag (1992–2002) and "Soulfood" (former "Creole Quartet"), together with Christian Frank (bass), Bjørn Olufsen (drums) and Wollert Krohn-Hansen (piano). He released his debut solo album Indigodalen (2001) with self-composed traditional folk music where he collaborated with Tord Gustavsen, Åsmund Reistad, Ingar Zach and Eline Monrad Vistven. It was followed by Improvisions  containing melodic free jazz recorded at the 'Sister Churches' in Gran (2005). In 2008 he released the album Love, the Blues together with Tord Gustavsen and the drummer Jon Christensen.

Opsahl was central to the support measures for the city of New Orleans after the Hurricane Katrina (2005). Han er til daglig gateprest i Kirkens Bymisjon, samt jazzanmelder for Verdens Gang and received Molderosen for this work. He has also taught jazz history at the University of Oslo, as well as written the textbook En fortelling om jazz (A tale of jazz, 'Unipub' 2001), and is editor of the book En god dag. Fortellinger til inspirasjon og ettertanke (A good day. Stories of inspiration and reflection, 'JM Stenersens Forlag' 2009) and received a Doctor's degree in theology 2012, with a thesis on spirituality and hip hop culture, "Dance to My Ministry: Exploring Hiphop Spirituality." In 2002–03 he was a visiting scholar at Union Theological Seminary in the City of New York.

Opsahl has written the melody of the hymn "Bortom tid og rom og tanke".

Discography (in selection)

Solo albums 
2001: Indigodalen (Heilo)
2005: Improvisions (Park Grammofon)
2008: Love, The Blues (Park Grammofon)

Collaborations 
With Caledonia Jazzband
1987: Walkin''' (Hot Club Records), feat. Wendell Brunious
2001: When The Saints (Hot Club Records), feat. Geoff Bull
2009: Street People (Hot Club Records)

With Chateau Neuf Spelemannslag
1995: Spell (Heilo)
1997: Tjuvgods (Grappa Music)
2001: Curing Norwegian Stiffness (Heilo)

With Zotora
1998: Emigrate'' (Circular Recordings), on "Sargasso"

References

External links 

Norwegian jazz clarinetists
Norwegian jazz saxophonists
Norwegian jazz composers
Norwegian journalists
University of Oslo alumni
Musicians from Oslo
Norwegian music critics
Jazz writers
1964 births
Living people
21st-century saxophonists
21st-century clarinetists